The Daniel LeRoy House is located at 20 St. Marks Place in the East Village neighborhood of Manhattan in New York City.  The Greek Revival building was built in 1832 as part of a development  by Thomas E. Davis of 3½-story brick houses which spanned both sides of the street.  The Daniel LeRoy house is one of the three surviving houses of this development, the other two being 25 St. Marks Place and the Hamilton-Holly House at 4 St. Marks Place.   It has a marble entrance ornamented with vermiculated blocks.  LeRoy was an in-law of Peter Stuyvesant, and a South Street merchant, who lived in the house with his wife Elizabeth Fish, of the eminent Fish family.

The building was designated a landmark by the New York City Landmarks Preservation Commission in 1969, and was added to the National Register of Historic Places on October 29, 1982.  In Spring 1998, restorations were made on the house, including repainting, repointing brickwork and replacing cornices.

See also
National Register of Historic Places listings in Manhattan below 14th Street
List of New York City Designated Landmarks in Manhattan below 14th Street

References
Notes

Houses on the National Register of Historic Places in Manhattan
Federal architecture in New York (state)
Houses completed in 1832
Houses in Manhattan
New York City Designated Landmarks in Manhattan